Talsarn Halt was a small railway station in a very rural location on the Aberayron branch of the Carmarthen to Aberystwyth Line in the Welsh county of Ceredigion. Opened by the Lampeter, Aberayron and New Quay Light Railway, the branch to Aberayron diverged from the through line at Lampeter.

History
The branch was incorporated into the Great Western Railway during the Grouping of 1923, passing on to the Western Region of British Railways on nationalisation in 1948. Passenger services were discontinued in 1951, general freight in 1963 and milk traffic in 1973. The single platform was built from wooden railway sleepers and can still be seen from the nearby road.

Micro-history
Dylan Thomas lived in nearby Talsarn in the 1940s.

References

Notes

Sources

Great Western Railway Journal Vol 2 No 16 (Autumn 1995)

Former Great Western Railway stations
Disused railway stations in Ceredigion
Railway stations in Great Britain opened in 1911
Railway stations in Great Britain closed in 1951
1911 establishments in Wales